Mesocentrotus is a genus of echinoderms belonging to the family Strongylocentrotidae.

The species of this genus are found in Japan and Northern America.

Species:

References

Strongylocentrotidae
Echinoidea genera